Theodore F. Morse (April 13, 1873 – May 25, 1924) was an American composer of popular songs.

Biography
Born in Washington, D.C., Morse was educated at the Maryland Military and Naval Academy.  He went on to study both violin and piano.  He and his wife, Theodora Morse, became a successful songwriting team for Tin Pan Alley.  Listed as Terriss & Morse, they were one of the earliest Tin Pan Alley husband-wife songwriting teams.

Morse died from pneumonia in New York City on May 25, 1924.

His song "Blue Bell, the Dawn is Waking..." became popular in Germany shortly after WW1 due to its marching rhythm. In 1920, Erich Tessmer wrote German lyrics, and the song was performed by the Freikorps. Then the German Stormtroopers used it as their march with new lyrics "Kamerad, reich mir die Hände"; another version of the lyrics was used by their opponents, the Rotfront ("Hunger in allen Gassen"). When the Nazis came to power, they used the song as a Hitler Youth march with a newer version of lyrics "Deutschland, du Land der Treue".

Partial list of songs
1902 "Two Little Boys", lyrics by Edward Madden
1903 "Dear Old Girl", lyrics by Richard Henry Buck 
1903 "Nautical Nonsense (Hurrah for Baffin's Bay!)" from The Wizard of Oz, lyrics by Vincent Bryan
1903 "It Takes the Irish to Beat the Dutch", lyrics by Edward Madden
1904 "Blue Bell", lyrics by Edward Madden & Theodora Morse
1905 "Daddy's Little Girl", lyrics by Edward Madden
1907 "I Want to be a Merry, Merry Widow", lyrics by Edward Madden
1908 "Down in Jungle Town", lyrics by Edward Madden
1908 "I've Taken Quite a Fancy to You", lyrics by Edward Madden
1908 "The Old Time Rag", lyrics by Edward Madden
1908 "Stupid Mister Cupid", lyrics by Edward Madden
1909 "Blue Feather", lyrics by Jack Mahoney
1911 "Another Rag", lyrics by Theodora Morse
1911 "Auntie Skinner's Chicken Dinner" words and music by Earl Carroll, Arthur Fields & Theodore F. Morse
1913 "Down in Monkeyville", lyrics by Grant Clarke & Edgar Leslie
1913 "Salvation Nell", lyrics by Grant Clarke & Edgar Leslie
1915 "If They'd Only Fight the War with Wooden Soldiers", lyrics by Bert Fitzgibbon
1915 " M-O-T-H-E-R", lyrics by Howard Johnson
1915 "Soldier Boy, lyrics by D.A. Esrom 
1916 "Good Old U.S.A.", lyrics by Jack Drislane 
1917 "Hail! Hail! The Gang's All Here" with Arthur Sullivan (lyrics by D. A. Esrom) 
1917 "My Red Cross Girlie (The Wound Is Somewhere in My Heart)", lyrics by Harry Bewley 
1917 "Sing Me Love's Lullaby", lyrics by Theodora Morse (as Dorothy Terriss)
1917 "Our Lanky Yankee Boys in Brown", lyrics by Edward Madden and Robt. F. Roden
1917 "Throw No Stones in the Well That Gives You Water", lyrics by Arthur Fields
1917 "We'll Knock the Heligo - Into Heligo Out of Heligoland!", lyrics by John O'Brien
1918 "Mother Here's Your Boy" with Sidney D. Mitchell and Archie Gottler
1918 "When a Blue Service Star Turns to Gold", lyrics by Casper Nathan
1918 "When I get Back to My American Blighty", lyrics by Arthur Fields
1923 "Cut Yourself a Piece of Cake", lyrics by Billy James
1924 "Don't Blame It All on Me", lyrics by Theodora Morse & Leo Wood
1924 "Monkey Doodle", lyrics by Theodora Morse & Leo Wood

(all music by him only unless when stated otherwise)

See also 
 How much wood would a woodchuck chuck

References

External links

Sheet Music for "M-O-T-H-E-R: A Word That Means the World to Me"; music by Theodore F. Morse; lyrics by Howard E. Johnson; Leo Feist, Inc., 1915
Sheet music for "'Lizabeth Ann: A Southern Love Song", New York: Theodore Morse Co., 1911. From Wade Hall Sheet Music Collection
 Theodore F. Morse recordings at the Discography of American Historical Recordings.

Songwriters from Washington, D.C.
American male songwriters
1873 births
1924 deaths